Disaulota is a monotypic moth genus in the subfamily Arctiinae erected by George Hampson in 1900. Its single species, Disaulota leptalina, was first described by Herbert Druce in 1885. It is found in Costa Rica.

References

Lithosiini
Monotypic moth genera
Moths of Central America